Chicopee is a former mill village located approximately four miles south of downtown Gainesville, and is in Hall County, Georgia, United States.

Chicopee was designed in 1925 by Earle Sumner Draper for the Chicopee Manufacturing Corporation, a subsidiary of The Johnson and Johnson Company. It was his last mill town project and his most successful. It was the personal project of Robert Wood Johnson II. Construction started in 1927 and the village consisted of 217 homes, a company store, medical office, and the mill across the street. The mill is the earliest example of a large single story textile plant built in the South.

The village is unincorporated and has a population of approximately 350. Originally the property was laid out for roughly 500 homes but only 217 homes were built in the first phase and the full plan was never completed. It is now a historic district within the city of Gainesville.

Chicopee is registered on the National Register of Historic Places.

References

Further reading 

Unincorporated communities in Hall County, Georgia
Unincorporated communities in Georgia (U.S. state)